Speaking of Jane Roberts is a biography of Jane Roberts written by Susan M. Watkins. It was published on August 21, 2006.

External links 

 Book review on ForeWord Magazine

References 

Jane Roberts
American biographies